The 2001–02 Kent State Golden Flashes men's basketball team represented Kent State University in the 2001–02 NCAA Division I men's basketball season. Led by head coach Stan Heath, the Flashes finished their best season in program history, posting a 30–6 record and advancing to the Elite Eight of the 2002 NCAA Division I men's basketball tournament after defeating seventh-seeded Oklahoma State, upsetting second-seeded Alabama and third-seeded Pittsburgh, before falling to eventual national runners-up Indiana. The team set program and Mid-American Conference (MAC) records for overall number of wins in a season with 30 and conference wins at 17, while the team's 21-game winning streak set the MAC and team records for both overall winning streak and single-season winning streak.

Roster

Schedule and results

|-
!colspan=9 style=| Non-Conference Games

|-
!colspan=9 style=| Conference Games

|-
!colspan=9 style=| MAC Tournament

|-
!colspan=9 style=| NCAA Tournament

Rankings

References

Kent State Golden Flashes men's basketball seasons
Kent State
Kent State
Kent State
Kent State